Timoci Tavatavanawai Tabaleka (born 14 February 1998) is a Fijian rugby union player who plays for  in the Bunnings NPC and  in Super Rugby. His position is Wing.

Career 
Born and raised in Fiji, Tavatavanawai played for the Fiji national under-20 rugby union team before moving to New Zealand where he started playing for the Central Rugby Club in the Marlborough Region. He was named in the Tasman Mako squad for the 2021 Bunnings NPC. Tavatavanawai made his debut for Tasman in Round 1 of the competition against , starting at number 14 in a 14-27 win for the Mako. After a very impressive first 7 games for Tasman Tavatavanawai was signed by Moana Pasifika in October 2021 for the 2022 Super Rugby Pacific season.

References

External links
 

Fijian rugby union players
1998 births
Living people
Rugby union wings
People educated at Queen Victoria School (Fiji)
Tasman rugby union players
Moana Pasifika players